This list outlines the names of popular lead film actors, who previously worked or are currently working in the Tamil film industry ("Kollywood"), based in Chennai, Tamil Nadu, India. The list is ordered by the year of their debut as a leading actor or the year of their landmark film. Actors who have starred in at least five films as lead are included in the list.

1930s

1940s

1950s

1960s

1970s

1980s

1990s

2000s

2010s

References

Lists of film actors
Tamil film actors
Lists of actors by ethnicity